The Big Town All Stars was a short-lived BBC radio programme that aired from March 1998—July 2001.  There were nine half-hour episodes and it was broadcast on BBC Radio 4. It was created by Bill Dare and starred Stephen Tompkinson, Nicola Walker, Adrian Scarborough, Meera Syal, Clive Rowe and Brian Bovell.  The plot revolved around the members of an amateur a cappella group as they tried for success.

Episodes
 Pilot, 19 March 1998
 If You Scratch My Back, 16 February 2000
 The Perfect Man, 23 February 2000
 If You Sack Me, I'll Leave, 1 March 2000
 Band of Gold, 8 March 2000
 Meet the Wife, 3 July 2001
 Fifteen Minutes of Fame, 10 July 2001
 East Coast Story, 17 July 2001
 The Ballad of Kenny and Christine, 24 July 2001

Notes and references

References

BBC Radio 4 programmes
1998 radio programme debuts